Rush Hour is an album by the American jazz saxophonist Joe Lovano, featuring an orchestra arranged and conducted by Gunther Schuller, recorded in 1994 and released on the Blue Note label.

Reception
The AllMusic review by Scott Yanow stated: "This is one of the most exciting jazz releases of 1995... on the basis of this date alone, Lovano must rank as one of the top tenors of the 1990s".

Track listing
All compositions by Joe Lovano except as indicated
 "Prelude to a Kiss" (Duke Ellington, Irving Gordon, Irving Mills) - 3:58 
 "Peggy's Blue Skylight" (Charles Mingus) - 3:33 
 "Wildcat" - 2:57 
 "Angel Eyes" (Earl Brent, Matt Dennis) - 5:09 
 "Rush Hour On 23rd Street" (Gunther Schuller) - 8:53 
 "Crespuscle With Nellie" (Thelonious Monk) - 5:43 
 "Lament For M" (Schuller) - 5:41 
 "Topsy Turvy" - 4:27 
 "The Love I Long For" (Howard Dietz, Vernon Duke) - 3:11 
 "Juniper's Garden" - 2:40 
 "Kathline Gray" (Ornette Coleman) - 3:26 
 "Headin' Out Movin' In" (Schuller) - 11:13 
 "Chelsea Bridge" (Billy Strayhorn) - 3:41

Personnel
Joe Lovano – tenor saxophone, soprano saxophone, bass clarinet, drums, arranger
Gunther Schuller – arranger
Jack Walrath – trumpet
David Taylor – bass trombone, tuba
John Clark – French horn
Richard Oatts – flute, tenor saxophone
Ed Schuller, Mark Helias – bass
George Schuller – drums
James Chirillo – guitar
Judi Silvano – vocals

References

External links
 

Blue Note Records albums
Joe Lovano albums
1995 albums